The men's 5000 metres event at the 2002 Asian Athletics Championships was held in Colombo, Sri Lanka on 12 August.

Results

References

2002 Asian Athletics Championships
5000 metres at the Asian Athletics Championships